Alejandro Javier Sabella (5 November 19548 December 2020) was an Argentine football player and manager. Born in Buenos Aires, he began his playing career with River Plate in his home country before moving to England in 1978 to play for Sheffield United. Known as "Alex" while in England (an anglicised version of his real name), Sabella then had a spell with another English side, Leeds United, before returning to South America and representing Estudiantes, Grêmio, Ferro Carril Oeste and Irapuato.

After retiring from playing, Sabella became a coach and began a long association with fellow countryman and close friend Daniel Passarella, serving as his assistant manager during Passarella's spells managing Argentina, Italian club Parma, Uruguay, Mexican club Monterrey and Corinthians in Brazil. The duo finally returned to River Plate for whom they had both played before Sabella struck out on his own to become manager of Estudiantes in his own right, winning the Argentine Primera División Apertura championship and the 2009 Copa Libertadores. Sabella resigned from Estudiantes in February 2011 and was subsequently appointed as the coach of the Argentina national team, coaching them to the 2014 FIFA World Cup Final against Germany, where they lost 1–0 in extra time. Sabella had scheduled his resignation to take effect after the conclusion of the World Cup.

Sabella died on 8 December 2020 due to an intra-hospital virus which caused him a heart disease. He was 66 years old.

Playing career

Early life and career

Alejandro Sabella was born to a middle-class family in Buenos Aires' well-off Palermo neighborhood.

 He was an excellent student at school, and was admitted to the Faculty of Law of the University of Buenos Aires, but his career as a football player eventually forced him to abandon his studies. As a young man Sabella was politically active in the left-wing Peronist Youth and worked to aid the urban poor in the slums. He stated, "I felt a growing need to be always on the side of solidarity and of the distribution of wealth for a fairer, more egalitarian society, in which we can all have equal opportunities."

As a footballer, Sabella rose through the junior divisions of River Plate in the early 1970s, when his position of attacking midfielder was covered by Norberto Alonso. His style reflected Alonso's, with emphasis on individual technique and short passes. His slow pace gained him the nickname of Pachorra (lunfardo, Spanish for "slowcoach"). In 1975, River Plate won their first title after an 18-year drought, and Alonso became the fans' undisputed hero. Sabella got his break in 1976, when Alonso was transferred to Marseille. He played a key role when River won the 1977 Metropolitano championship. Nevertheless, when Alonso returned to River Plate, Sabella was again relegated to the bench.

Sheffield United

Second Division side Sheffield United had tried to sign Diego Maradona from Argentinos Juniors, however, the club decided that Maradona was too expensive. Therefore, United turned to Sabella, who they signed for £160,000 on 19 July 1978. Known as Alex while in England, Sabella made his debut for the Blades in a 2–1 defeat against Leyton Orient on 19 August 1978.

Sabella played for United until 1980, scoring eight league goals in 76 appearances. After relegation to the Third Division, manager Harry Haslam agreed a fee of £600,000 with Second Division club Sunderland. However, Sabella had ambitions to play in the First Division and refused to go. His last appearance for United came with a goal in the final of the Sheffield & Hallamshire County Cup, (a regional competition between South Yorkshire teams) giving victory over Sheffield Wednesday on 8 May 1980.

Leeds United and return to Argentina

During the close season, Sabella was sold to Leeds United for £400,000. He played for Leeds without much success between 1980 and 1981, making 23 appearances and scoring two goals. John Lukic used to give him a lift to training and matches from Sabella's digs in Sheffield.

In December 1981, Sabella started looking for an Argentine club and was eventually sold to Estudiantes de La Plata. Under coach Carlos Bilardo, the team reached the semi-finals of the 1982 Nacional tournament (Sabella was injured in the first semi-final match against Quilmes). Subsequently, Sabella, together with Marcelo Trobbiani, José Daniel Ponce and Miguel Ángel Russo, made up the solid midfield of the Estudiantes team that went on to win two back-to-back championship titles.

When Bilardo was put in charge of the Argentina national team, Sabella competed for his place with veterans Norberto Alonso and Ricardo Bochini, as well as younger players like Carlos Daniel Tapia, Jorge Burruchaga and Diego Maradona. Sabella played eight times for the national team, playing in all four games in the 1983 Copa América and in four friendlies; against Chile in May 1983 (as substitute), Paraguay in July 1983, Brazil in June 1984 and Uruguay in July 1984.

Later career
The Argentine midfielder then moved to Brazilian Grêmio, where he played from 1985 to 1986. He subsequently returned to Estudiantes, but retired after a short spell in the Mexican league with Irapuato in 1989.

Managerial career

Early career
After retirement, Sabella became a coach, but worked mostly as field assistant for Daniel Passarella. The duo coached the Argentina national team, Italian side Parma, the Uruguay national football team, Mexican Monterrey, and Brazilian Corinthians. In 2006, they were hired back by River Plate, that finished in third place in the Apertura tournament.

On 15 March 2009, Sabella became coach of Estudiantes de La Plata, where he won the 2009 Copa Libertadores. On 2 February 2011, he announced his resignation. Due to protestations from the team's players and management, he agreed to reconsider his decision, but made it final the following day. He officially resigned on 3 February 2011.

Argentina

After Argentina's early exit at the 2011 Copa America, Sabella was appointed as the manager of the Argentina national team. Sabella was originally set to be the new coach of UAE League team Al-Jazira Club but backed out of the agreement after the Argentine Football Association (AFA) has shown interest in him. After his appointment in August 2011, Sabella named Lionel Messi as Argentina's new captain. He made his debut in charge of the Argentina in a 1–0 victory against Venezuela at Salt Lake Stadium in Kolkata, India.

2014 World Cup
In the 2014 FIFA World Cup, Sabella coached Argentina to the final. The last time Argentina had advanced beyond the quarter-finals was when they made the final in 1990 where they lost 1–0 to West Germany.

Argentina never trailed during the whole tournament until the final. They won all three of their group games, where Lionel Messi scored all four of his goals against Bosnia and Herzegovina (2–1), Iran (1–0) and Nigeria (3–2). They defeated Switzerland 1–0 in extra time during the Round of 16, and then dispatched Belgium 1–0 in the quarter-finals. Reaching their first semi-final since 1990, Argentina eliminated the Netherlands in a penalty shootout after a scoreless draw. Argentina finished the tournament as runners-up after losing the final to Germany 1–0 through an extra time goal scored by Mario Gotze. Sabella's substitutions in the final, notably Sergio Agüero for Ezequiel Lavezzi and Rodrigo Palacio for Gonzalo Higuaín, were said to have blunted the team's attacking threat against the Germans, although many managers, such as Atlético Madrid's Diego Simeone, praised Sabella's tactical performance throughout the World Cup.

Sabella officially resigned on 30 July 2014.

Managerial statistics

Political views and public image

Sabella was interested in politics and history and had strong political views. He was a left-wing Peronist, and believed that "the state needs to be present to regulate politics and mark the path. We can't wait for the trickle-down effect to overflow, because that is a lie." In an interview he gave to La Garganta Poderosa, an Argentine alternative media outlet, he posed before a chalkboard with a "Dream Team" made up not of football players, but left-wing activists who have been killed or have gone missing since the return of democracy in 1983, many of them young victims of police violence.

Nicknames

During his playing career, Sabella's nicknames were el Mago ("the Magician") and Pachorra ("Sloth"), because of his perceived slowness during play. As Estudiantes manager, he would be called Magno (from Alejandro Magno) because of the great Club World Cup final they took part in: the favourites, star-studded Barcelona, would only manage to beat his squad in extra time, by 2–1.

Death
Sabella died on 8 December 2020 due to an intra-hospital virus which aggravated a heart disease. He was 66 years old.

Honours

Player
River Plate
Primera División: 1975 Metropolitano, 1975 Nacional, 1977 Metropolitano

Estudiantes (LP)
Primera División: 1982 Metropolitano, 1983 Nacional

Manager
Estudiantes (LP)
Copa Libertadores: 2009
Primera División: 2010 Apertura
FIFA Club World Cup runner-up: 2009

Argentina
FIFA World Cup runner-up: 2014

Notes

External links 

 Profile and tactical analysis in 

1954 births
2020 deaths
Footballers from Buenos Aires
Argentine people of Italian descent
Argentine expatriate sportspeople in England
Argentine footballers
Argentina international footballers
Argentine football managers
Association football midfielders
Argentine expatriate footballers
Expatriate footballers in England
Expatriate footballers in Brazil
Expatriate footballers in Mexico
Argentine Primera División players
English Football League players
Liga MX players
1983 Copa América players
Club Atlético River Plate footballers
Sheffield United F.C. players
Leeds United F.C. players
Estudiantes de La Plata footballers
Grêmio Foot-Ball Porto Alegrense players
Ferro Carril Oeste footballers
Irapuato F.C. footballers
Estudiantes de La Plata managers
Al Jazira Club managers
Argentina national football team managers
2014 FIFA World Cup managers
Argentine expatriate football managers